Christopher Melhuish (born 6 January 1955) was an English cricketer. He was a right-handed batsman who played for Devon. He was born in Exeter.

Melhuish, who played for Devon in the Minor Counties Championship between 1981 and 1986, made a single List A appearance for the team, during the 1983 NatWest Trophy.  From the upper-middle order, he scored 4 runs.

External links
 Christopher Melhuish at Cricket Archive 

1955 births
Living people
English cricketers
Devon cricketers